The 1997 season of the Bhutanese A-Division was the third recorded season of top-flight football in Bhutan. The league was won by Druk Pol, their second title in a row.

References

Bhutan A-Division seasons
Bhutan
Bhutan
football